Sergio Diduch is an Argentine association football player who currently plays for Hispano F.C. in the Honduran top division.

He started his career in Honduras playing for Real España in 2005.

Honours
 Individual:
 Top goal scorer in 2008–09 Clausura

References

Living people
1976 births
People from Villa Ángela
Argentine footballers
Hispano players
Real C.D. España players
F.C. Motagua players
Expatriate footballers in Honduras
Liga Nacional de Fútbol Profesional de Honduras players
Association football midfielders
Sportspeople from Chaco Province